The Harley Clarke Mansion consists of a French Eclectic-style house and coach house located at 2603 Sheridan Road in Evanston, Illinois, adjacent to the historic Grosse Pointe Light and Lighthouse Beach on Lake Michigan. Cited as a contributing structure for the Northeast Evanston Historic District that Evanston established with the National Park Service in 1999, it is listed on the National Register of Historic Places.

In 2016, Landmarks Illinois added the Harley Clarke Mansion to its list of most endangered historic places in Illinois.

History and architecture
Construction of the Harley Clarke Mansion, designed by architect Richard Powers, was completed in 1927 for Clarke, his wife, Hildur Freeman, and their two children, son John and daughter Hermena. Harley Clarke was a wealthy utilities magnate who had, at one time, simultaneously served as the president and treasurer of five separate subsidiary light, power, and gas companies. He was a part of the high-society of Chicago, having memberships to the Union League Club of Chicago and the Chicago Athletic Club, and serving as a promoter for the Shakespeare repertory at the Civic Theater. In 1930, he became the president of Fox Film. Clarke's fortune has been estimated at upward of $60 million

The three-story, 16-room, limestone mansion was originally situated on nearly five acres of lakefront property landscaped by Jens Jensen, a Prairie School landscape architect, in collaboration with Alfred Caldwell. Amongst the elements of the landscape was an informal wooded landscape on the bluff down to the home's private sand beach. This wooded bluff featured grassy clearings, and a "Indian Council Ring" (the latter being a personal signature of Jensen's landscapes). While the landscape has since been changed, several features of the original design currently remain. This includes a hemlock-shaded pond with waterfall, a council ring, many terraces and pathways, as well as portions of the original plantings.

The approximately 18,500-square-foot mansion includes seven bedrooms, a spacious glass conservatory, ballroom, basement rumpus room and coach house—as well as six towering chimneys, and a curving stair hall.

The house itself was supposed to be modeled after sixteenth century English Tudor country homes. Its red Ludovici tile roof has been said to suggest some Norman influence. The house has Cotswold-style appearance due to its random-coursed ashlar masonry walls, which are adorned by both carved limestone and red sandstone trim.

The house's chimneys tower above its roofline. The primary roofline of the house descends towards its lower levels through swooping eaves.

The main portion of the house is laid-out on a north–south orientation, lying parallel to the lakeshore. At the house's northern end is a section that was originally built as a service wing. The service wing has a lower roofline than the main portion of the house, and was laid out perpendicular to the house (on an east–west orientation).

The exterior of the house's main entrance is topped by a large statue of a flower bouquet. At the front of the house, ornamental lead rain gutter downspouts empty into ornamental semicircular metal cisterns. The home's main entrance hall is an elegant ovular wood-paneled space featuring a curving staircase, a fireplace. The entry hall has a view of Lake Michigan, visible through the tall windows of the home's east-facing bay-windowed sun porch, which is placed on a direct east–west axis from the entry.

The house's principal spaces on its ground floor were placed in an ensuite layout along the back side of the house, giving them lake views. The interior vista of the house's north–south axis culminated with the dining room fireplace at its north end, 
and on a door to the conservatory at its south end (which provided a view of year-round greenery to the home's principal spaces).

At the south end of the mansion, there is a large, glass-roofed conservatory with stone and glass walls. The conservatory has canopied entrances at both its east and west face. These entrances are flanked with large, square limestone piers adorned by iconic capitals. These piers are topped by stone statues depicting large bouquets of flowers, similar to the statue atop the main entrance.

To the west of the conservatory is a sizable coach house built in the same style as the main house.

Upon the house's completion, it received a design award from the Evanston Art Commission. It was the last house of its size to be constructed in Evanston prior to the Great Depression.

The Clarke family owned the house until 1949, when the Clarkes had to sell the house because of significant financial losses during the Great Depression.

Sigma Chi purchased the mansion and used it as the fraternity's national headquarters from 1951 to 1965, when the city of Evanston purchased it. A year later, Evanston Art Center leased the property until 2015, when the mansion began to require "more maintenance than either the city or the art center was able to fund."

The Harley Clarke Mansion has been vacant since the departure of the Evanston Art Center. A report commissioned by the city concluded in August 2016 that the mansion was mostly in 'serviceable condition', but still needs requires expenditures on repairs.

During the Evanston Art Center's occupancy of the mansion, the main-floor rooms were converted into exhibition galleries, and the second-floor bedrooms and third-floor ballroom were utilized as classroom space. The basement was also converted into a pottery studio featuring both electric and gas fired kilns, as well as a pottery wheel room, and glazing room. However the house's wood-paneled entry hall and library were retained.

Architectural and Local Significance 

In 1928, the mansion won a design award from the Evanston Art Commission.

The Harley Clarke Mansion was declared an Evanston landmark in 1982.

The Harley Clarke Mansion has been described as "...a striking architectural presence." In their 2004 book, "North Shore Chicago: Houses of the Lakefront Suburbs, 1890-1940," Evanston-based architect Stuart Cohen and historic preservation consultant Susan Benjamin write: "It was the last house of its size to be built in Evanston before the 1929 stock market crash."

According to Bonnie McDonald, president and CEO of Landmarks Illinois, "...(S)ome might call (Jensen) the equivalent of Frank Lloyd Wright in returning to an indigenous landscape and a reference to the prairie. So think of him as one of the most revolutionary landscape architects of his time. We find it counterintuitive that there may be discussion of demolition by the city of its own landmark."

The second edition of "Evanston: 150 Years, 150 Places" describes the Harley Clarke Mansion as "...one of Evanston's most picturesque mansions. Within, the rooms were arranged to provide views all the way through the house in both directions. This provided a view of Lake Michigan from the front door."

In a 2017 article on the Bob Villa website, "15 100-Year-Old Houses That Haven't Aged a Day," the Harley Clarke Mansion is ranked No. 14: "While Harley Clarke Mansion has at various times in its history served as a private residence, a fraternity headquarters, and a venue for local arts, it has never lost its original elegance or intrigue. The ninety-year-old ... lakefront property ... has had such an enchanting effect on Evanstonians that the city recently decided to open its historic doors to the public again."

Lakefront Master Plan 
In January 2008, Evanston City Council unanimously approved the Lakefront Master Plan as a "blueprint for future renovation projects along Evanston’s lakefront."

The plan authors concluded that the Harley Clarke Mansion, then home to the Evanston Art Center should be fully restored. Page 91 of the plan includes this language:

The historic nature of these facilities should be maintained and celebrated, and accordingly, the key elements of the master plan for this area focus on restoration of the historic structures and the Jens Jensen landscape. Two new activities are proposed, which are intended to increase awareness of the facilities and to provide modest revenue to support this restoration.

Many key elements of the original Jens Jensen landscape remain largely intact, although the grotto and lily pond are in need of significant repair. The original council ring remains and is still in use today, although few people are aware of the significance of this feature. The woody landscape plantings are healthy, and provide a balance of habitat and usable space. The cultural value of this landscape should be recognized, and future work should be undertaken with the intent to maintain Jensen’s original vision.

The plan proposes to make use of the beautiful grounds of both the Arts Center and Lighthouse for low impact public functions such as weddings and small receptions, and an improved event lawn is proposed for the space east of the Lighthouse, between the Fog and Signal houses. This space should be available for reservation by the public for a fee, with the proceeds going to support the restoration of the buildings and grounds.

The plan also proposes to make use of the existing Carriage House to provide space for an appropriately themed café and/or gift shop, which could generate more visits to the Arts Center, provide higher quality food than typical park concessions, and create a venue for local artists, musicians, and writers to share their work. While this would also generate additional revenue in support of restoration and maintenance, the plan recognizes that these funding sources alone will not be enough to cover all that is needed. Additional funding in the way of grants and private donations should be pursued to enable these facilities to make better use of the public funds already allocated.

Privatization Efforts 

In 2013, Evanston City Council rejected an offer from Jennifer Pritzker and her company, Tawani Enterprises, to renovate the Harley Clarke Mansion and convert it into a 57-room, boutique hotel. The company offered to purchase the property, including 2.5 acres of land for $1.2 million, and maintain public access to the beach. Opposition centered around the privatization of public land.

Public Use Efforts 

In late 2013, the Illinois Department of Natural Resources began discussions with city council to purchase the Harley Clarke Mansion as "an office space and public coastal education center." The deal fell through in early 2015, following the election of a new governor in November 2014 and Evanston's preference for a lease versus the sale the state agency wanted. A state budget crisis also may have contributed.

Preservation Efforts and Campaign for Demolition 

In June 2017, the city of Evanston issued a request for proposals from nonprofit organizations to lease the property and assume ongoing management and maintenance. One of the proposals received was from Evanston Lakehouse & Gardens (ELHG), a local nonprofit group focused on renovating the property into a "... fully renovated, multi-purpose venue for environmental education, community events and cultural programming." That November, city council voted 8-1 to approve the proposal from ELGH and instructed the city manager to negotiate a 40-year lease with the group.

However, on April 9, 2018, after approximately six months of negotiations between the city and ELHG, city council members said they were concerned by the group's 10-year timeline to secure funding and by the city's potential liability—and voted the plan down. In June 2018, city council approved a resolution for the city manager to meet with Evanston Lighthouse Dunes, a privately funded group that offered to finance a project to raze the Harley Clarke Mansion and "...restore the natural dunes, beach and parkland as part of a new public space...." The city manager was authorized to enter into a memorandum of understanding with Evanston Lighthouse Dunes, fewer than 40 days later, in a 5-3 city council vote on July 23, 2018.

The June 2018 vote by city council prompted an editorial from Blair Kamin, architecture critic for The Chicago Tribune: "What in the name of progressive politics is going on here? How can a left-leaning town that has shot down skyscraper proposals on the grounds that they would wipe out historic buildings be contemplating the destruction of an official city landmark? ... The mansion, just north of Northwestern University’s campus, is a precious, irreplaceable architectural and cultural resource. Instead of exploring how to get rid of it, the city should be redoubling its efforts to save it."

On July 25, 2018, a volunteer group, Save Harley Clarke, filed petitions with the Evanston city clerk to place a nonbinding resolution on the November 2018 ballot. The resolution, approved in August 2018 to appear on the ballot, calls this yes-or-no question: "Shall the City of Evanston protect from demolition and preserve the landmark Harley Clarke buildings and gardens next to Lighthouse Beach, for use and access as public property, consistent with the Evanston Lakefront Master Plan, at minimal or no cost to Evanston taxpayers?" On November 6, 2018 Evanston voters overwhelmingly voted in support of saving the Harley Clarke mansion from demolition, with more than 80% of voters answering “yes”. Some Evanston precincts reported “yes” support as high as 95%.

As part of city council's July 23, 2018, vote to proceed with demolition, the question of whether to demolish the Harley Clarke Mansion was forwarded to the Evanston Preservation Commission. On Oct. 23, 2018, the commission unanimously voted, in a 10-0 decision, to deny the city's request for a demolition permit. City Manager Wally Bobkiewicz, who argued the city's request for the permit, said he would appeal the ruling to city council, which can overrule the preservation commission's vote and proceed with demolition.

In supporting his vote against the city's demolition permit request, preservation commission co-chair Ken Itle said: "I have seen nothing presented to justify the demolition of this building.... It's very clear that it's a significant building, it's a significant piece of architecture, it's a unique design and it would be a great loss to the city if it were demolished."

Artists Book House 
The Evanston City Council voted on Monday, February 8, 2021 to enter into negotiations with Artists Book House, a literary and book arts non-profit organization, for a long-term lease of the Harley Clarke Mansion. The City Council awarded a forty-year lease to Artists Book House, pending a five year period of fundraising and renovation of the Harley Clarke Mansion. The Council made the decision a little over a year after receiving compelling proposals and presentations from four organizations (Artists Book House, Evanston Community Lakehouse & Gardens, Evanston Conservancy, and ONECommunity Museum), for the future of the Harley Clarke Mansion, Coach House, and the Jens Jensen Gardens. The decision had been delayed due to the COVID-19 pandemic. In May 2021, Artists Book House was given the keys to the mansion, and with the help of many intrepid volunteers, began the process of cleaning the house and assessing its current condition.

John Eifler (Eifler & Associates), Nick Patera (Teska Associates, Inc.) are working with Artists Book House to restore and renovate the Harley Clarke Mansion and grounds for educational programming and public use. This will include print, paper and book binding studios, conference rooms and classrooms for teaching writing and for hosting book groups, and a papermaker’s garden. A café serving light fare, an art gallery and a bookstore will be open to the public. Additional public programming, such as artist talks, author readings and poetry slams, will be scheduled to coincide with the academic year.

Controversy 
In October 2018, council member Ann Rainey—who represents Evanston's Eighth Ward—appeared before the city's ethics board to defend herself against citizen-filed complaints that her advocacy of demolishing the Harley Clarke Mansion violated city rules. On Oct. 25, 2018, mayoral-appointed members of the Evanston Ethics Board unanimously ruled that Rainey had violated the rules and recommended she recuse herself from future votes regarding the property. The recommendation now goes to the city council's Rules Committee, on which all nine city council members sit, for final disposition.

"The ethics board agreed on two 4-0 votes that Rainey both abused her power as an alderman and violated city code that governs impartiality among employees and officers."

References

External links 
 Harley Clarke Mansion, city of Evanston website

Tudor Revival architecture in Illinois
National Register of Historic Places Multiple Property Submissions in Illinois
Houses completed in 1927
Evanston, Illinois
1927 establishments in Illinois